Ochrosia brevituba, synonym Neisosperma brevituba, is a species of plant in the family Apocynaceae. It is endemic to New Caledonia.

References

Endemic flora of New Caledonia
brevituba
Vulnerable plants
Taxonomy articles created by Polbot